Saint-Martin-de-Castillon is a commune in the Vaucluse department in the Provence-Alpes-Côte d'Azur region in southeastern France.

Geography
The river Calavon flows westward through the middle of the commune and forms part of its western border.

Notable people
 Henri-Pierre Roché (28 May 1879 – 9 April 1959), French author, is buried here.

See also
 Côtes du Luberon AOC
 Communes of the Vaucluse department
 Luberon

References

Communes of Vaucluse